Tayisiya Morderger (born 7 March 1997) is a German tennis player.

Morderger has career-high singles ranking of world No. 400, achieved on 18 September 2017, and a best WTA doubles ranking of No. 242, reached on 3 February 2020. She has won five singles titles and ten doubles titles on tournaments of the ITF Circuit.

Morderger made her WTA Tour main-draw debut at the 2020 Prague Open, partnering her twin sister Yana in the doubles event, falling to Lucie Hradecká and Kristýna Plíšková in the first round.

ITF Circuit finals

Singles: 13 (5 titles, 8 runner–ups)

Doubles: 25 (11 titles, 14 runner-ups)

References

External links
 
 

1997 births
Living people
German female tennis players
Sportspeople from Kyiv
German people of Ukrainian descent